Right Now is a 2013 studio album released by Italian-American Jazz guitarist Fabrizio Sotti.  The album is notable for its blending of Sotti's backgrounds as a jazz musician, hip-hop producer, and pop songwriter across collaborations with Shaggy, Ice-T, Tony Grey, Mino Cinelu, Zucchero, Melanie Fiona, Isabella Lundgren, M1 of Dead Prez, and more. 
 
The album was recorded at Fabrizio's Sotti Studios in NYC and mixed at Piety Studios in New Orleans by legendary engineer John Fishback, while Sotti produced and arranged all of the songs on the album.
 
Right Now was inspired by Sotti's diverse musical background, and a range of his musical inspirations.  The album features reinterpretations of Pink Floyd's "The Wall," Jimi Hendrix's “The Wind Cries Mary,” and Bob Marley's “Waitin’ in Vain” alongside Sotti's own songs and compositions.

Credits 
Fabrizio Sotti: Electric Guitar, Acoustic Guitar, Classical Guitar
Tony Grey: Bass
Mino Cinelu: Drums, Percussion, Vocals on “Paradis”
Isabella Lundgren – Vocals on “One”
Shaggy – Vocals on “Waitin’ in Vain”
Res – Vocals on “Waitin’ in Vain,” The Wall
Zucchero – Vocals on “Someone Else’s Tears”
Ice-T – Vocals on “The Wall”
M1 – Vocals on “The Wall”
Melanie Fiona – Vocals on “The Wind Cries Mary”
Claudia Acuna – Vocals on “Fidjo Maguado”
Algebra Blessett – Vocals on “Fall With Me”
Isabella Lundgren – Vocals on “Once in a Bluemoon”
 
Produced by Fabrizio Sotti
Mixed by John Fishback
Mastered by Alan Silverman
Engineers: John Fishback, Simone “Keemo” Tonsi and Fabrizio Sotti

Track listing 
      One (featuring Isabella Lundgren) – Written by U2 
      Waitin in Vain  (featuring Shaggy and Res) – Written by Bob Marley
      Paradis (featuring Mino Cinelu) – Written by Sotti/ Cinelu
      Someone Else's Tears (featuring Zucchero) – Written by Zucchero/Bono
      The Wall (featuring Ice-T, Res, and M1 of Dead Prez) – Written by Roger Waters
      The Wind Cries Mary (featuring Melanie Fiona) – Written by Jimi Hendrix
      Prancing Horse – Written by Fabrizio Sotti
      Right Now – Written by Fabrizio Sotti
      Fidjo Maguado (featuring Claudia Acuna) – Written by Jorge Monteiro
  Fall With Me (featuring Algebra Blesset) – Written by Sotti/Blessett
  Once in a Bluemoon (featuring Isabella Lundgren) – Written by Fabrizio Sotti
  While the Sun is Rising – written by Fabrizio Sotti

References

2013 albums
Fabrizio Sotti albums